Leucopogon leptospermoides is a species of flowering plant in the heath family Ericaceae and is endemic to eastern Australia. It is an erect, bushy shrub with elliptic to lance-shaped or oblong leaves, and white, tube-shaped flowers usually arranged singly in upper leaf axils.

Description
The leaves are glabrous and the lower surface is finely striated.

Taxonomy
Leucopogon leptospermoides was first formally described in 1810 by Robert Brown in his Prodromus Florae Novae Hollandiae et Insulae Van Diemen. The specific epithet (leptospermoides) means "leptospermum-like".

Distribution and habitat
This leucopogon grows in coastal heath and open woodland in Queensland to as far south as Hawks Nest on the north coast of New South Wales.

References

leptospermoides
Ericales of Australia
Flora of New South Wales
Flora of Queensland
Plants described in 1810
Taxa named by Robert Brown (botanist, born 1773)